Beldağı is a village in the Amasya District, Amasya Province, Turkey.  And it has Wind Turbine on top of the mountain. Its population is 265 (2021).

References

Villages in Amasya District